Piezura is a small genus of small flies of the family Fanniidae. Distribution is mostly restricted to the Holarctic biogeographic region. Two species, P. pardalina and P. graminicola are found in Europe. Unlike the other Fanniidae, Piezura have plumose arista.

Species
P. graminicola (Zetterstedt, 1846) 
P. nearctica Chillcott, 1961 
P. nigrigenus Nishida, 1975 
P. pardalina Rondani, 1866 
P. pardalina shanxiensis Xue, 1999

References

Fanniidae
Muscoidea genera
Taxa named by Camillo Rondani